Alexander Ivanovich Koreshkov (born 23 July 1952) is a Russian professional football coach and a former player.

Honours
 Soviet Top League champion: 1979.

External links
 

1952 births
Sportspeople from Saratov
Living people
Soviet footballers
Soviet Top League players
FC Sokol Saratov players
FC Spartak Moscow players
FC Fakel Voronezh players
FC SKA-Khabarovsk players
Soviet football managers
Russian football managers
FC Sokol Saratov managers
FC Akhmat Grozny managers
FC Rotor Volgograd managers
Russian Premier League managers
FC Neman Grodno managers
FC Fakel Voronezh managers
Expatriate football managers in Belarus
Association football midfielders